"Do Ya Do Ya (Wanna Please Me)" is a song by British singer Samantha Fox, released as the second single from her debut album, Touch Me (1986). The hard rock song was her second consecutive number one in Sweden, supplanting "Touch Me (I Want Your Body)". It was also a top ten hit in the UK, Switzerland, and Germany. The lyrics taunt the listener with lines such as "Are you strong enough?" and "I could get you underneath my thumb." Fox performed the song on a 1986 episode of Top of the Pops, and to this day remains a recurring feature of her live repertoire.

Music video
The accompanying music video for "Do Ya Do Ya (Wanna Please Me)" begins with Samantha Fox emerging from a limousine in a ruffled shirt and studded black leather jacket. Her valet looking on, Fox performs the number with her band while pulling several pranks on them. The clip featured members of Hanoi Rocks; Nasty Suicide, Timo "Timppa" Kaltio, Terry Chimes and Dave Tregunna as Fox's band.

Track listings
 12" vinyl UK (0577346)
"Do Ya Do Ya (Wanna Please Me) (Vixen Mix)" (6:13)
"Do Ya Do Ya (Wanna Please Me) (Extended Version)" (5:18)

 12" vinyl DE (6.20627 AE)
"Do Ya Do Ya (Wanna Please Me) (Foxy Mix)" (6:13)
"Do Ya Do Ya (Wanna Please Me) (Extended Version)" (5:18)
"Drop Me a Line" (3:48)

 12" vinyl US (1033-1-JD)
"Do Ya Do Ya (Wanna Please Me) (Extended Version)" (5:18)
"Do Ya Do Ya (Wanna Please Me) (7" Version)" (3:48)
"Do Ya Do Ya (Wanna Please Me) (Vixen Mix)" (6:13)
"Do Ya Do Ya (Wanna Please Me) (Instrumental Version)" (3:48) 	
"Want You to Want Me" 	(3:30)

 7" vinyl UK (FOXY 2)
"Do Ya Do Ya (Wanna Please Me)" (3:48)
"Never Gonna Fall in Love Again" (5:10)

 7" vinyl CAN (1031-7-J)
"Do Ya Do Ya (Wanna Please Me)" (3:48)
"Want You to Want Me" (3:30)

Charts

Weekly charts

Year-end charts

References

1986 songs
1986 singles
Samantha Fox songs
Jive Records singles
Number-one singles in Finland
Number-one singles in Sweden